Juan Antonio 'Tuto' Sañudo Herrero (born 13 June 1956) is a Spanish retired footballer who played as a central defender.

Club career
Born in the village of Serdio in Val de San Vicente, Sañudo played 304 La Liga matches over the course of ten seasons, with Racing de Santander and Real Oviedo. He scored 12 goals for the former, which he reached in 1978 from neighbouring Deportivo Rayo Cantabria, and made his debut in the Spanish top flight on 7 January 1979 in a 3–1 home win against Valencia CF. 21 days later, also in the league, he grabbed a brace to help the hosts defeat FC Barcelona 2–1, in an eventual relegation-ending season.

Sañudo was voted the league's best defender for the 1985–86 campaign, helping Racing to the 12th position. He played his first and only game in the UEFA Cup on 3 October 1991 at the age of 35, as Asturias's Oviedo lost 3–1 at Genoa C.F.C. and 3–2 on aggregate in the first round.

Sañudo competed in the Segunda División with both his main clubs, and was at one time Racing's most-capped player in the top division, but was later surpassed by Pedro Munitis and José María Ceballos. He retired at the end of 1992–93 at the age of 37, after totalling 3,151 minutes of action to help the Cantabrians to a third promotion to the main tier.

Post-retirement
After retiring, Sañudo worked as an insurance agent and in lodging, and he also provided commentary for Racing Santander's matches at Cadena COPE.

On 31 January 2014, Sañudo succeeded Ángel Lavín as chairman as Racing was immersed in a severe institucional and financial crisis. On 14 June of the following year, he was replaced by Manolo Higuera, another former footballer of the club.

References

External links

1956 births
Living people
Spanish footballers
Footballers from Cantabria
Association football defenders
La Liga players
Segunda División players
Tercera División players
Rayo Cantabria players
Racing de Santander players
Real Oviedo players
Spanish football chairmen and investors